The 1916 TCU Horned Frogs football team represented Texas Christian University (TCU) as a member of the Texas Intercollegiate Athletic Association (TIAA) during the 1916 college football season. Led by Milton Daniel in his first year as head coach, the Horned Frogs compiled an overall record of 6–2–1. The team's captain was John Nelson, who played quarterback.

Schedule

References

TCU
TCU Horned Frogs football seasons
TCU Horned Frogs football